The Red Sea Station was a military formation of the Royal Navy. At various times it has also been referred to as Egypt Division and Red Sea and later the Red Sea and Canal Area. The Royal Navy had distinct formations for the Red Sea at intervals from 1846 until circa 1944-45.

History
The Royal Navy established a Red Sea formation as early as 1846, administered by the Royal Indian Navy. It was subordinate to the Commander-in-Chief, East Indies until 1883, when it became part of the Mediterranean Fleet. In 1914 the station came under command of the Commander-in-Chief Mediterranean Fleet until the end of the war. Following the war the Red Sea was reabsorbed back under the Commander-in-Chief, East Indies.

During the East African Campaign, the Red Sea Force fought the Italians. British code-breakers of the Government Code and Cypher School (GC&CS) at Bletchley Park in the UK, deciphered Italian orders of 19 May 1940, coded using C38m machines, secretly to mobilise the army and air force in East Africa. Merchant traffic was stopped by the British on 24 May, pending the introduction of a convoy system. The force was to conduct a blockade Italian East Africa (Operation Begum), attack the Red Sea Flotilla and protect the sea lanes from Aden to Suez.

On 21 October 1941 the Mediterranean Fleet's responsibilities were extended to include the Red Sea and Aden, including the Gulf of Aden. The Mediterranean Fleet thus took over the Red Sea Division of the Red Sea Station, which was located between the Gulf of Aden and the Suez Canal, excluding Suez Port. Rear-Admiral Ronald Hallifax took command as Flag Officer, Red Sea (FORS). Three weeks later the responsibilities were adjusted once more. On 14 November 1941 the Senior Naval Officer-in-Charge, Suez, who was based at Port Tawfik (Suez Port) was placed under the command of Rear Admiral Hallifax.

Over a hundred kilometres to the north, halfway up the Suez Canal, the Senior British Naval Officer, Suez Canal Area, based at Ismailia, remained responsible for all British naval policy questions in regards to the Suez Canal Company.

In January 1944 the station was transferred back from the Mediterranean Fleet to C-in-C East Indies.

Commodore Commanding, Red Sea Division
Incomplete list of post holders included:

Rear-Admiral, Egypt and Red Sea
Post holders included:
 Note:Command is also known as Egypt Division and Red Sea.

Senior Naval Officer, Red Sea Patrol

Incomplete list of post holders included:

Senior Naval Officer, Red Sea Force

Senior Naval Officer, Red Sea
Incomplete list of post holders included:

Flag Officer, Red Sea

Senior Naval Officer in Charge, Suez
Included:

Flag Officer, Commanding Red Sea and Canal Area

First established at Port Said, it was commissioned on 8 January 1940. There were outposts at Adabya, Kabrit, Ismailia, Generiffa, Port Tewfik. HMS Stag was paid off in May 1949.

HMS Euphrates at Basra seemingly reported to Flag Officer, Red Sea and Canal Area, from its establishment in 1942.

Notes

References 
 Allen's Indian Mail and Register of Intelligence, for British and Foreign and India and China and all parts of the East. London, England: W. H. Allen and Company. 1846.
 Brown, David (2013). The Royal Navy and the Mediterranean: Vol.II: November 1940-December 1941. Cambridge, England: Routledge. .
 Harley, Simon; Lovell, Tony (2018). "Egypt - The Dreadnought Project". www.dreadnoughtproject.org. Harley and Lovell.
 Houterman, Jerome N..; Koppes, Jeroen (2004–2006). "Royal Navy, Mediterranean Fleet 1939-1945". www.unithistories.com. Houterman and Koppes, Netherlands.
 Jr, Harold E. Raugh (2008). British Military Operations in Egypt and the Sudan: A Selected Bibliography. Lanham, Maryland, USA: Scarecrow Press. .
 Kindell, Don (2012). "Admiralty War Diaries: Loss of HMS Khartoum, June 1940". www.naval-history.net. Gordon Smith.
 Low, Charles Rathbone (1877). History of the Indian Navy: (1613-1863). London, England: R. Bentley and Son.
 Watson, Dr Graham. (2015) "Royal Navy Organisation in World War 2, 1939-1945". naval-history.net. Gordon Smith.

Commands of the Royal Navy
Military units and formations established in 1846
Military units and formations disestablished in 1944